Abbasabad-e Talabi (also Romanized as ‘Abbāsābād-e Tālabī) is a village in Shusef Rural District, Shusef District, Nehbandan County, South Khorasan Province, Iran. At the 2006 census, its population was 44, in 13 families.

References 

Populated places in Nehbandan County